The  is a public aquarium in Minato-ku, Nagoya, Aichi Prefecture, Japan. It is the public aquarium with the largest tank capacity and total area in Japan. It also owns Japan's largest dolphin show tank.

History

Opened in 1992, the Port of Nagoya Public Aquarium is a public aquarium operated by Nagoya Minato Promotion Foundation.
When it opened, it was the largest dolphin show tank in the world.

There is also a breeding research facility for penguins and sea turtles in the building. In the past, the aquarium has had success in breeding emperor penguins, Adelie penguins and chinstrap penguins.

In 2015, a shark ray that accidentally ate a puffer fish survived and attracted a lot of attention.

Research and Conservation 
 Sea turtles
 In 1995, the artificial hatching of loggerhead turtles was successful, and was the first in Japan to be laid at an indoor artificial spawning ground.
 Since 2003, in collaboration with the  US National Oceanic and Atmospheric Administration (NOAA), young loggerhead turtles have been tagged and released, to research migratory routes in the North Pacific using an artificial satellite tracking system. In addition, loggerhead turtles have been successfully bred for two generations; this won the Koga award from the Japanese Association of Zoos and Aquariums (JAZA). The aquarium has also successfully hatched emperor penguins.

 Penguins
 Gentoo penguins, chinstrap penguins and Adelie penguins have been successfully bred. This won an award from JAZA. The aquarium has also successfully hatched emperor penguins.

 Beluga whales
 On July 17, 2004, the beluga whale named Mama gave birth. This was the first beluga whale born in captivity in Japan. Further births, by various whales, happened in 2007, 2010, and 2012.

 Orca reproductive physiology research and environmental enrichment
 On November 13, 2012, the orca named Stella gave birth to a female, the first orca born at the aquarium.

Killer Whales

Killer whale captivity began in October 2003 with Kū, followed by Nami, Stella, Bingo and Ran, and on November 13, 2012, Stella's calves were born. 

Since December 2015, three orcas, Stella, Lynn and Earth are being kept at the aquarium. All killer whales kept in Japan have been made up of relatives since the death of Nami in January 2011, and only Stella and her grandchildren since the death of Bingo in  August 2014.

Kū

Nami
In 2010, the aquarium acquired a killer whale named , who was to live at the aquarium permanently and feature in its Orca Show.

Bingo and Stella
Plans were made in January or February 2011 for the aquarium to receive two killer whales, a male, Bingo, and a female, Stella, on a five-year loan from Kamogawa Sea World in Chiba Prefecture.
The two adult killer whales arrived on December 16, 2011 by ship. Their daughter, Ran 2, arrived by truck the day before, on December 15, 2011. On November 13, 2012, Stella gave birth to a female calf, Lynn.

Bingo died on August 2, 2014, after suffering an illness. Stella is still alive today and currently lives at Port of Nagoya with her daughter Lynn and her grandson Earth.

Family structure
Father Bingo – Captured in Iceland in 1984 – Died at the Port of Nagoya Public Aquarium on August 2, 2014 (estimated 32 years old)
Mother Stella – Captured in Iceland in 1987 and Rearing in the Port of Nagoya Public Aquarium
Eldest daughter Rabbie – January 11, 1998 – Born at Kamogawa Sea World
Lovey's husband Oscar – Captured in Iceland in 1987 – Died at Kamogawa Sea World on December 20, 2012 (estimated 27 years old)
Lovey's eldest son Earth – October 13, 2008 – Born at the Port of Nagoya Public Aquarium
Lovey's eldest daughter Luna – July 19, 2012 – Born at Kamogawa Sea World
Second daughter Lara – February 8, 2001– Born at Kamogawa Sea World
Sarah, the third daughter – May 31, 2003 - Died at Kamogawa Sea World on April 26, 2006 (2 years and 10 months)
Ran 2, fourth daughter – February 25, 2006 - Born at Kamogawa Sea World
Lynn, fifth daughter  – November 13, 2012 –　Born at the Port of Nagoya Public Aquarium

Facilities

North Building
Japanese sea
Aurora sea
Sea of evolution
Underwater bleachers
Main pool
Aurora sea

South Building
Japanese sea
Large Kuroshio Tank
Deep sea gallery
Equatorial sea
Sea turtle migration tank
Australian waterside
Antarctic ocean
Jerry Fish Nagori Umu
Touch tank

There is also a cinema hall and a turtle breeding research facility.

Gallery
Exterior

Aquarium

Dolphin

Killer whale

Baluga whale

Access
The aquarium is close to Nagoyakō Station on the subway's Meikō Line.

See also
 Nagoya Port
 List of captive orcas
 Captive killer whales
 Italia Mura
 Japanese icebreaker Fuji (AGB-5001)

References

External links

  
 English web page

Animal theme parks
Aquaria in Japan
Buildings and structures in Nagoya
Tourist attractions in Nagoya